
 

Richard Heidrich (27 July 1896 – 22 December 1947) was a German paratroop general during World War II. He was a recipient of the Knight's Cross of the Iron Cross with Oak Leaves and Swords of Nazi Germany.

Heidrich was taken prisoner on 3 May 1945 and released in July 1947. He died on 22 December 1947 in a care hospital in Hamburg-Bergedorf.

Awards

 Clasp to the Iron Cross (1939) 2nd Class (25 May 1941) & 1st Class (25 May 1941)
 German Cross in Gold on 31 March 1942 as Oberst in Fallschirmjäger-Regiment 3
 Knight's Cross of the Iron Cross with Oak Leaves and Swords
 Knight's Cross on 14 June 1941 as Oberst and commander of the Fallschirmjäger-Regiment 3
 Oak Leaves on 5 February 1944 as Generalleutnant and commander of the 1. Fallschirmjäger-Division
 Swords  on 25 March 1944 as Generalleutnant and commander of the 1. Fallschirmjäger-Division

References
Citations

Bibliography

 
 
 

|-

|-

1896 births
1947 deaths
People from the Kingdom of Saxony
Luftwaffe World War II generals
German Army personnel of World War I
Reichswehr personnel
Generals of Parachute Troops
Recipients of the clasp to the Iron Cross, 1st class
Recipients of the Gold German Cross
Recipients of the Knight's Cross of the Iron Cross with Oak Leaves and Swords
German prisoners of war in World War II held by the United Kingdom
Military personnel from Saxony
People from Görlitz (district)
Battle of Crete